The  is a multi-purpose convention center in the city of Ginowan, Okinawa Prefecture, Japan. They opened in 1987. It has a capacity of 5,000. It is the former home arena of the Ryukyu Golden Kings basketball team.

References

External links
Okinawa Convention Center

Basketball venues in Japan
Sports venues in Okinawa Prefecture
Music venues in Japan
Convention centers in Japan
Indoor arenas in Japan
Theatres in Japan
1987 establishments in Japan
Sports venues completed in 1987
Event venues established in 1987
Ryukyu Golden Kings